Marie de L'Épinay, real name Ève Olivia Angela Josépha de Bradi, baronne de Bruchez (Rebréchien, 1802 – Paris, 30 January 1864) was a French femme de lettres.

Biography 
The daughter of the Countess Pauline Bradi who held a literary salon and was a contributor to the Journal des dames et des modes from 1818, Marie L'Épinay was often invited by the Duchess of Berry to the court balls.

Her husband, the Swiss officer Stephen Bruchez of Épinay, preferred she took care of their children, rather than writing. Yet, she published numerous verses, stories, novels of manners, plays and newspaper articles, including in 1835, several for the Journal des Femmes.

She also wrote the music for a few romances and in 1836, she worked at Biographie des femmes auteurs contemporaines. Famous under her name as well as under the pseudonyms Ève de Bruchez or Ève de Bradi (sometimes Brady), she owned and was chief editor of the Journal des dames et des modes (5 July 1836 – 19 January 1839).

From 1839, she was responsible for the importante chronique de mode of other magazines for women such as La Sylphide (January 1840 – 1847) and Paris Élégant (1845), as well as the chronique littéraire of the La Corbeille de Mariage (1847–1848) and the Journal des Jeunes Personnes. In 1846 she also wrote for L’Écho français.

Works 

1836: Deux Souvenirs, Olivier
1837: Deux Études
1838: Les Femmes célèbres
1844: Rosette, 2 vols., Magen
1844: Aimer et mourir, feuilleton
1844: L'École d'un fat, comedy in 1 act and in prose, with Armand-Numa Jautard
1845: Berthilde, 2 vols., Magen
1846: La femme du diable, feuilleton
1846: Les Trois Grâces, Paris
1847: Les Beautés de l'âme, Janet
1850: Les quatre fils Aymon, de Vigny
1850: Sœur Agathe, de Vigny
1852: Blanche, de Vigny
1852: La cave aux diamants, de Vigny
1860: Clara de Noirmont, Leclercq
1864: Les Contes de nuit, Dentu
undated: Cours de morale

Sources 
 Joseph Marie Quérard, La littérature française contemporaine: XIXe siècle, 1852, (p. 96)
 Edmond-Denis De Manne, Nouveau dictionnaire des ouvrages anonymes et pseudonymes, 1862, (p. 16)
 Gustave Vapereau, L'année littéraire et dramatique, 1865, (p. 374)
 Pierre Larousse, Larousse du XIXe siècle, Épinay (Ève-Olivia-Angéla de Bradi, baronne de Bruchez, connue en littérature sous le pseudonyme de Marie de L')
 Annemarie Kleinert, Le Journal des dames et des modes ou la conquête de l'Europe féminine (1797-1839), 2001, (p. 230-233)

1802 births
1864 deaths
French women writers
People from Loiret
19th-century French writers
19th-century women writers